Coy Ernest Ruple (born October 27, 1945 in Conway, Arkansas) is a former American football tackle who played two seasons in the National Football League (NFL) for the Pittsburgh Steelers. 

Ruple played college football at the University of Arkansas before being drafted into the NFL Draft in 1968. He played high school football at Conway High School in Conway, Arkansas.

References

1945 births
Living people
People from Conway, Arkansas
American football offensive linemen
Arkansas Razorbacks football players
Pittsburgh Steelers players